Ordzhonikidzevsky City District is one of the seven city districts of the city of Perm in Perm Krai, Russia, located on both banks of the Kama River. Population:

History
The city district was established on March 16, 1940, when the city borders were expanded.

References

City districts of Perm, Russia